Dewar may refer to:

Clan Dewar
Vacuum flask (also known as a Dewar flask), a vacuum-insulated container used to maintain internal temperature for extended periods
 Cryogenic storage dewar, a specialised vacuum flask for extremely cold fluids
Dewar benzene
John Dewar & Sons, makers of Dewar's blended Scotch whisky
Dewar (caste), a fishing caste from India
Dewar Creek, British Columbia, Canada

People
Arthur Dewar, Lord Dewar (1860–1917), Scottish politician and judge.
Arthur Dewar (cricketer) (1934–2020), Scottish cricketer
Donald Dewar (Rt. Hon. Donald Campbell Dewar, 1937–2000), former Scottish politician and the first First Minister of Scotland
Douglas Dewar (1875–1957), British ornithologist and critic of the theory of evolution
Geordie Dewar (1867-1915), Scottish football player
George Dewar (disambiguation), various people
Isla Dewar (1946 – 2021), Scottish novelist and screenwriter
Jackie Dewar (1923–2011), Scottish footballer
Jacqueline Dewar, American mathematician
James Dewar (disambiguation)
Jim Dewar (disambiguation)
John Dewar, 1st Baron Forteviot (1856–1929), Scottish businessman and MP
John Dewar, 2nd Baron Forteviot (1885–1947), Scottish businessman and soldier
John Michael Dewar (1883–1941), Scottish ornithologist
Kenneth Dewar (1879–1964), Vice-Admiral of the Royal Navy
Kim Dewar, New Zealand swimmer
Marion Dewar (1928–2008), Mayor of Ottawa, Canada, and MP
Michael J. S. Dewar (1918-1997), English theoretical chemist
Neil Dewar (1908–1982), Scottish football player
Paul Dewar (1963–2019), Canadian teacher and MP
Thomas Dewar, 1st Baron Dewar (1864-1930), Scottish whisky distiller
William McLachlan Dewar, headmaster of George Heriot's School in Edinburgh, Scotland
 Michael Kenneth O’Malley Dewar (1942–2016), chief of Clan Dewar

Places
 Dewar (crater), a lunar impact crater
 Dewar Nunatak, Adelaide Island, Antarctica
 Dewar, Scottish Borders, Scotland
 Dewar, Iowa, United States 
 Dewar, Oklahoma, United States

See also
Devar, 1966 Indian film
Divar, island in Goa, India
Divar (website), Iranian classifieds website
Deewaar (disambiguation)